Print Screen (often abbreviated Print Scrn, Prnt Scrn, Prnt Scr, Prt Scrn, Prt Scn, Prt Scr, Prt Sc, Pr Sc or PS) is a key present on most PC keyboards. It is typically situated in the same section as the break key and scroll lock key. The print screen may share the same key as system request.

Original use
Under command-line based operating systems such as MS-DOS, this key causes the contents of the current text mode screen memory buffer to be copied to the standard printer port, usually LPT1. In essence, whatever is currently on the screen when the key is pressed will be printed. Pressing the  key in combination with  turns on and off the "printer echo" feature. When echo is in effect, any conventional text output to the screen will be copied ("echoed") to the printer. There is also a Unicode character for print screen, .

Modern use
Newer-generation operating systems using a graphical interface tend to save a bitmap image of the current screen, or screenshot, to their clipboard or comparable storage area. Some shells allow modification of the exact behavior using modifier keys such as the control key.

In Microsoft Windows, pressing  will capture the entire screen, while pressing the  key in combination with  will capture the currently selected window. The captured image can then be pasted into an editing program such as a graphics program or even a word processor. Pressing  with both the left  key and left  pressed turns on a high contrast mode (this keyboard shortcut can be turned off by the user). This behavior is therefore backward compatible with users who learned Print Screen actions under operating systems such as MS-DOS. In Windows 10, the  key can be configured to open the 'New' function of the Snip & Sketch tool. This allows the user to take a full screen, specific window, or defined area screenshot and copy it to clipboard. This behaviour can be enabled by going to Snip & Sketch, accessing Settings via the menu and enabling the 'Use the PrtScn button to open screen snipping'.

In KDE and GNOME, very similar shortcuts are available, which open a screenshot tool (KSnapshot or GNOME Screenshot respectively), giving options to save the screenshot, plus more options like manually picking a specific window, screen area, using a timeout, etc. Sending the image to many services (KDE), or even screen recording (GNOME), is built-in too.

These key combinations are used to provide more functionality including the ability to select screen objects.  captures the whole screen, while  allows for part of the screen to be selected. The standard print screen functions described above save the image to the desktop. However, using any of the key sequences described above, but additionally pressing the  will modify the behavior to copy the image to the system clipboard instead.

Notable keyboards
On the IBM Model F keyboard, the key is labeled PrtSc and is located under the Enter key. On the IBM Model M, it is located next to the F12 key and is labeled Print Screen.

References

Computer keys
Computing terminology